The yellow-plumed honeyeater (Ptilotula ornata) is a species of bird in the family Meliphagidae. It is endemic to Australia, where it inhabits temperate forests and Mediterranean-type shrubby vegetation.

The yellow-plumed honeyeater was previously placed in the genus Lichenostomus, but was moved to Ptilotula after a molecular phylogenetic analysis, published in 2011, showed that the original genus was polyphyletic.

Description
The yellow-plumed honeyeater is a medium-sized honeyeater with a relatively long, down-curved black bill, a dark face and a distinctive, upswept yellow neck plume. It has an olive-green head, with a faint yellow line under the dark eye, grey-green upperparts, and heavily streaked grey-brown underparts. Young birds have a yellow bill base and eye-ring.

Similar species include purple-gaped honeyeater, grey-fronted honeyeater and fuscous honeyeater.

Call
The song is a loud, clear, three-note chier wit chier, often performed before dawn, and by males during display flight.

Distribution
The yellow-plumed honeyeater is endemic to southern mainland Australia, from western New South Wales and Victoria, through South Australia to south-west Western Australia.

Ecology and behaviour

The main habitat type for yellow-plumed honeyeater is mallee. They occupy a broader range of habitat in the west of their range, including dry eucalypt woodland and eucalypt open-forest. They occasionally occur outside their usual habitat, such as in Acacia and Callitris woodland, and seasonally in flowering red ironbark forest, flowering grey box-yellow box woodland. 

They occur in sedentary, colonial groups, which may relocate in response to harsh conditions. They are noisy and conspicuous, and will jointly defend nesting or feeding territories, by engaging in communal wing quivering displays.

Diet
Yellow-plumed honeyeater are mainly insectivorous, foraging actively mainly in outer and upper foliage, branches and trunks of eucalypts, and taking insects on the wing. They also feed opportunistically on nectar, including from various mallee eucalypts, yellow gum, grey box, red ironbark, and box mistletoe.

Reproduction
Yellow-plumed honeyeaters build an open, cup-shaped nest suspended by the rim from a thin fork or from foliage of mallee eucalypts and other small shrubs. Nests are made from wool, green grass and spider-webs, and lined with wool, grasses, plant-down and brightly-coloured feathers. Both parents feed the young, sometimes with the assistance of helpers.

Yellow-plumed honeyeater nests are parasitised by fan-tailed cuckoos, pallid cuckoos, Horsfield's bronze-cuckoos and shining bronze-cuckoos.

Conservation actions

Conservation status
The species is listed under the IUCN Red List of Threatened Species as a species of Least Concern.

Protected areas
The yellow-plumed honeyeater occurs in several protected areas, including:
 South Australia
 * Gluepot Reserve

 Victoria
 * Greater Bendigo National Park
 * Inglewood Nature Conservation Reserve
 * Wychitella Nature Conservation Reserve

References

External links

Photos, audio and video of yellow-plumed honeyeater from Cornell Lab of Ornithology's Macaulay Library
Recording of yellow-plumed honeyeater from Graeme Chapman's sound library

Ptilotula
Birds of South Australia
Birds described in 1838
Taxonomy articles created by Polbot